Amphimallon furvum is a species of beetle in the Melolonthinae subfamily that can be found in Italy, Kosovo, Montenegro, Serbia, Switzerland and Voivodina.

References

Beetles described in 1817
furvum
Beetles of Europe